John E. McCormac is an American Democratic Party politician, who is serving as the Mayor of Woodbridge Township, New Jersey.   He served as State Treasurer of New Jersey for four years in the cabinets of former Governor of New Jersey James McGreevey and former Gov. Richard Codey.

Biography
McCormac was born and raised in Woodbridge. He attended St. Cecelia's grammar school in Iselin and graduated from St. Thomas Aquinas High School in 1976. He earned a BA in Accounting from Rutgers University and a master's degree in Finance from St. John's University.

McCormac had served as chief financial officer and business administrator of Woodbridge Township, during McGreevey's tenure as Mayor of the Township.  When McGreevey became governor, he named McCormac to the treasurer's job.  Codey, who succeeded McGreevey in November 2004, retained McCormac in the post for his administration.

After leaving the treasurer's office in January 2006, McCormac announced his intention to seek the Democratic nomination for Mayor of Woodbridge in the 2007 election.  He was planning on opposing Mayor Frank Pelzman in the Democratic primary.  Following Pelzman's unexpected death in July 2006, a special election was called for November 2006 to fill a 14-month term as mayor.  The Woodbridge Democratic Party nominated McCormac as their candidate in the special election.  State Senator Joseph Vitale was appointed to serve as mayor until the special election winner was certified.  McCormac took office as mayor on November 13, 2006. He is a member of the Mayors Against Illegal Guns Coalition.

References

External links
Mayoral campaign website

1958 births
Living people
St. Thomas Aquinas High School (New Jersey) alumni
Mayors of Woodbridge Township, New Jersey
State treasurers of New Jersey
New Jersey Democrats
Rutgers University alumni
St. John's University (New York City) alumni
21st-century American politicians